The Massachusetts Line was those units within the Continental Army that were assigned to Massachusetts at various times by the Continental Congress during the American Revolutionary War. These, together with similar contingents from the other twelve states, formed the Continental Line.  Line regiments were assigned to a particular state, which was then financially responsible for the maintenance (staffing and supplying) of the regiment.  The concept of the line was also particularly important in relation to the promotion of commissioned officers. Officers of the Continental Army below the rank of brigadier general were ordinarily ineligible for promotion except in the line of their own state.

The size of the Massachusetts Line varied from as many as 27 active regiments (at the outset of the war) to four (at its end).  For most of the war after the siege of Boston (April 1775 to March 1776) almost all of these units were deployed outside Massachusetts, serving as far north as Quebec City, as far west as present-day central Upstate New York, and as far south as Yorktown, Virginia.  Massachusetts line troops were involved in most of the war's major battles north of Chesapeake Bay, and were present at the decisive siege of Yorktown in 1781.  General officers of the line included Major Generals Artemas Ward, William Heath, and Benjamin Lincoln, and Brigadier Generals John Glover and John Nixon.

History
The line's history began in the immediate aftermath of the Battles of Lexington and Concord in April 1775, after which the Massachusetts Provincial Congress raised 27 regiments as a provincial army.  These units, which were mostly organized by mid-May, were adopted into the first establishment of the Continental Army in June 1775.  These units were generally referred to by the names of their colonels, and were numbered one way by the state and another by the Continental Army.

At the end of 1775 the army was reorganized into its second establishment; a number of Massachusetts units were disbanded, but some were retained and others established.  In the 1776 establishment regiments from the northern states identified as Continental regiments.  At the end of 1776 the army was again reorganized.  The third establishment restored a state-based regimental numbering scheme which was retained until the end of the war.  After two major reorganizations (at the start of 1781 and 1783) the army was almost completely disbanded in November 1783, leaving a single regiment under the command of Massachusetts Colonel Henry Jackson.

Non-line units 
Not all Continental infantry regiments raised were part of a state quota. On December 27, 1776, the Continental Congress gave Washington temporary control over certain military decisions that the Congress ordinarily regarded as its own prerogative. These "dictatorial powers" included the authority to raise sixteen additional Continental infantry regiments at large.

Early in 1777, Washington offered command of one of these additional regiments to David Henley of Massachusetts, who accepted. Henley had been adjutant general on the staffs of Generals William Heath and Joseph Spencer, and was briefly lieutenant colonel of the 5th Massachusetts Regiment.

Washington also offered command of an additional regiment to William Raymond Lee of Massachusetts, who accepted. In 1776, Lee had been the major of John Glover's famous Marblehead regiment, the 14th Continental Regiment.

Finally, Washington offered command of an additional regiment to Henry Jackson of Massachusetts, who accepted. These three regiments were raised in Massachusetts in the spring of 1777. Much of the recruiting for them was done in the Boston area, which until then had been unable to raise troops because of the British occupation.

Henley's and Lee's Regiments were consolidated into Jackson's Regiment on April 9, 1779. Jackson's Regiment was allotted to the Massachusetts Line on July 24, 1780, and officially designated the 16th Massachusetts Regiment. The 16th Massachusetts Regiment was disbanded on January 1, 1781. Colonel Jackson remained in service until 1784, leading the last remaining regiment in the Continental Army.

1775 establishment
On April 23, 1775, the Massachusetts Provincial Congress voted to raise a volunteer force of 13,600 men, and it called upon the other New England colonies for assistance in raising an army of 30,000 men. The Massachusetts provincials were raised in the spring of 1775 and were eventually formed into twenty-six infantry regiments. Massachusetts also took responsibility for a twenty-seventh regiment, originally raised in
New Hampshire. Massachusetts regiments had an official establishment of 599 officers and men in ten companies (but five regiments had an eleventh company). The troops were enlisted to serve until December 31, 1775.  The commissions of all Massachusetts officers were dated May 19, 1775.  Subsequently, the regiments were numbered, although in Massachusetts the regiment was commonly identified by the name of its colonel.

The New England delegates to the Continental Congress urged that the Congress assume responsibility for the provincial troops of New Hampshire, Massachusetts, Rhode Island, and Connecticut, that were blockading Boston. This was done on June 14, 1775, and these troops were designated the Continental Army. George Washington was selected as commander in chief of this force, and all other Continental Army troops, the following day.

In an effort to weld the separate New England armies into a single "Continental" Army, on August 5, 1775, General Washington ordered that a board be convened to determine the rank of the regiments at Boston. The board was to consist of a brigadier general as moderator and six field officers as members. It completed its task on August 20, 1775, and reported its decision to Washington. The regiments of infantry in the Continental Army were accordingly numbered without reference to their colony of origin. There were thirty-nine "Regiments of Foot in the Army of the United Colonies." In General Orders, Washington often referred to his regiments by these numbers; and they appear in the strength reports compiled by Adjutant General Horatio Gates.

1776 establishment
On November 4, 1775, the Continental Congress resolved that on January 1, 1776, the Continental Army, exclusive of artillery and extra regiments, was to consist of 27 infantry regiments. The troops were to be enlisted to serve until December 31, 1776. The quota of regiments assigned to the states was 1 from Pennsylvania, 3 from New Hampshire, 16 from Massachusetts, 2 from Rhode Island, and 5 from Connecticut.

Each regiment was to have an official establishment of 728 officers and men in eight companies. The regiments were to receive numbers instead of names. For the campaign of 1776 Massachusetts was to provide the 3d, 4th, 6th, 7th, 12th, 13th, 14th, 15th, 16th, 18th, 21st, 23d, 24th, 25th, 26th, and 27th Continental Regiments.

The reduction of the Massachusetts Line from an establishment of 16,468 officers and men in 275 companies to an establishment of 11,648 officers and men in 128 companies required a difficult reorganization.

The numbered Continental regiments raised in Massachusetts were widely scattered in the campaign of 1776. In April, following the British evacuation of Boston, five regiments (the 6th, 14th, 16th, 18th, and 27th) were ordered to remain in Massachusetts, four of them occupying Boston. Three of these regiments (the 14th, 16th, and 27th) joined the Main Army in July. The 6th and 18th regiments joined the Northern Army in August, and never rejoined the Main Army. Of the eleven regiments that moved to New York City in April, three regiments (the 15th, 24th, and 25th) were ordered to Canada as reinforcements. One of these regiments (the 15th) rejoined the Main Army in November, and served at Trenton and Princeton. The 24th and 25th regiments, that had served in the Northern theater, also rejoined the Main Army in November, but marched directly to the army's winter quarters at Morristown, New Jersey. Finally, the 7th Continental Regiment, which served in Parsons' Brigade, was assigned to the Highlands Department in November.

Disbanded 1775 units 
The remnants of the regiments of Asa Whitcomb, James Frye, Ebenezer Bridge, Ephraim Doolittle, and Benjamin Ruggles Woodbridge were disbanded at Cambridge, Massachusetts, on December 31, 1775.

1777 establishment 
During 1776, the Continental Congress gradually overcame its ideological objections to a standing army, and, on September 16, 1776, it resolved that, on January 1, 1777, the Continental Line was to consist of 88 infantry regiments, to be maintained for the duration of the war. The quota of regiments assigned to the states was 3 from New Hampshire, 15 from Massachusetts, 2 from Rhode Island, 8 from Connecticut, 4 from New York, 4 from New Jersey, 12 from Pennsylvania, 1 from Delaware, 8 from Maryland, 15 from Virginia, 9 from North Carolina, 6 from
South Carolina, and 1 from Georgia. The quotas for states outside New England included regiments that had been on the Continental establishment earlier, but the term Continental Line was now broadened to include the lines of all the states.

Disbanded 1776 units 
The remnant of the 12th Continental Regiment, under Colonel Moses Little, was disbanded at Morristown, New Jersey in February 1777.

The remnant of the 13th Continental Regiment, under Colonel Joseph Read, was disbanded at Morristown, New Jersey, in January 1777. However, the remnant of Peters' Company was consolidated with Bailey's Regiment and reorganized as Warren's Company; and the remnant of Walbridge's Company was consolidated with Putnam's Regiment and reorganized as Goodale's Company.

The remnant of the 14th Continental Regiment, under Colonel John Glover, was disbanded in eastern Pennsylvania on December 31, 1776. Glover later returned to the Continental service as a general officer and commanded one of the Continental Army's Massachusetts brigades. His third in command, Major William Raymond Lee, became the colonel of Lee's Additional Continental Regiment.

1778-1779 reorganization
While the Main Army, that portion of Washington's army under his immediate command, was in winter quarters at Valley Forge, the Congress acted to reduce the size and increase the tactical efficiency of the Continental Army. On May 27, 1778, it resolved that the number of infantry regiments be reduced from 88 to 80. The quota of regiments assigned to the states was 3 from New Hampshire, 15 from Massachusetts, 2 from Rhode Island, 8 from Connecticut, 5 from New York, 3 from New Jersey, 11 from Pennsylvania, 1 from Delaware, 8 from Maryland, 11 from Virginia, 6 from North Carolina, 6 from South Carolina, and 1 from Georgia. Under this reorganization, the Massachusetts quota was unchanged.

The official establishment of a regiment was reduced to 582 officers and men. Each regiment was to consist of nine rather than eight companies. The ninth company was to be a company of light infantry, and was to be kept up to strength by drafting men from the regiment's eight other companies if necessary. During the campaigning season, the light infantry companies of the regiments in a field army were to be combined into a special corps of light infantry.

Because the Continental Congress passed this resolve at the beginning of the campaigning season, it was nearly a year before this reorganization was completed. The reorganization of the Continental Line was finalized on March 9, 1779.

On July 24, 1780, Henry Jackson's Additional Continental Regiment was officially redesignated the 16th Massachusetts Regiment.

1781 reorganization
In October 1780, the Continental Congress, in consultation with General Washington, passed resolutions providing for what would be the last reorganization of the Continental Army before its final disbandment. The Congress determined that on January 1, 1781, the Continental Line was to be reduced from 80 regiments to 50. The quota of regiments assigned to the states was 2 from New Hampshire, 10 from Massachusetts, 1 from Rhode Island, 5 from Connecticut, 2 from New York, 2 from New Jersey, 6 from Pennsylvania, 1 from Delaware, 5 from Maryland, 8 from Virginia, 4 from North Carolina, 2 from South Carolina, and 1 from Georgia. In addition, 1 regiment (Colonel Moses Hazen's Canadian Regiment) was to be raised at large.

Under this reorganization, the Massachusetts quota was reduced from fifteen regiments to ten. Accordingly, the 11th, 12th, 13th, 14th, 15th, and 16th Massachusetts Regiments were disbanded on January 1, 1781.

The official establishment of an infantry regiment was increased to 717 officers and men. Each regiment continued to have nine companies, including a light infantry company, but the companies were made larger. For the first time, each regiment was to have a permanent recruiting party of 1 lieutenant, 1 drummer, and 1 fifer. Thus, there were to be ten recruiting parties in Massachusetts to systematically find and forward recruits to the Massachusetts regiments in the field.

Peace negotiations
The prolonged period of peace negotiations following the surrender of Lord Cornwallis at Yorktown, on October 19, 1781, presented the Continental Congress with the dilemma of keeping up a military force until the definitive peace treaty was signed, even though the national finances were exhausted. On August 7, 1782, the Continental Congress resolved that the states should reduce their lines on January 1, 1783. Each regiment retained in service was then to contain not less than 500 rank and file.

The preliminary peace treaty was signed on November 30, 1782.

1783 reorganization
On January 1, 1783, the 9th Massachusetts Regiment was disbanded at West Point and the 10th Massachusetts Regiment was disbanded at Verplanck's Point, New York, reducing the Massachusetts Line to eight regiments.

Great Britain signed preliminary articles of peace with France and Spain on January 20, 1783, and, on February 4, 1783, Britain announced the cessation of hostilities.  The Continental Congress received the text of the preliminary peace treaty on March 13, 1783, and proclaimed the cessation of hostilities on April 11, 1783. It ratified the preliminary peace treaty on April 15, 1783.

In General Orders issued at Newburgh, New York, April 18, 1783, Washington announced that the armistice would go into effect at noon, April 19, 1783 - the eighth anniversary of the battles of Lexington and Concord.

Demobilization
The 5th, 6th, 7th, and 8th Massachusetts Regiments were placed on furlough on June 12, 1783, and were never recalled to active duty.

The final treaty of peace was signed in Paris on September 3, 1783.  On October 18, 1783, the Continental Congress proclaimed that Continental troops on furlough were to be discharged on November 3, 1783. The Main Army, with the exception of a small observation force in the Hudson Highlands under the command of General Henry Knox, was disbanded on November 3, 1783. The disbanded units included the 1st, 2nd, 3rd, and 4th Massachusetts Regiments. After this date no part of the Massachusetts Line remained in the field, although the four furloughed regiments were still not formally disbanded.

The Northern Army was disbanded on November 5, 1783, and the Southern Army was disbanded on November 15, 1783. On the latter date the furloughed 5th, 6th, 7th, and 8th Massachusetts Regiments were formally disbanded, and the Massachusetts Line ceased to exist.

New York City was evacuated by British troops on November 25, 1783. The
British fleet left New York City on December 4, 1783, and on the same day Washington bid farewell to his officers at Fraunces Tavern.

First American Regiment of 1784 
After November 3, 1783, the Continental Line was reduced to a handful of units. These disbanded in November and December. The single regiment remaining in service after the new year began was under the command of Massachusetts Colonel Henry Jackson, and was known as the 1st American Regiment.

The Continental Congress ratified the Treaty of Paris on January 14, 1784, and the United States and Great Britain exchanged ratifications of the Treaty of Paris on May 12, 1784.  The 1st American was disbanded at West Point, New York, on June 2, 1784.

Notes

References 
Boatner, Mark M. III. Encyclopedia of the American Revolution. New York: David McKay Co., Inc. (Bicentenniel Edition, 1974. Originally Published, 1966).
Carrington, Henry B. Battles of the American Revolution. New York: Promontory Press (Reprint Edition. Originally Published, 1877).
Chamberlain, George Walter. "Soldiers of the American revolution of Lebanon Maine"
Fitzpatrick, John C. Editor. The Writings of George Washington from the Original Manuscript Sources. Available  from the University of Virginia website.
Force, Peter. American Archives. Available, in part,  from the Northern Illinois University website.
Heitman, Francis B. Historical Register of Officers of the Continental Army During the War of the Revolution, April 1775 to December 1783. Baltimore: Genealogical Publishing Co., 1967 (Originally published, 1914).
Lesser, Charles H. Editor. The Sinews of Independence: Monthly Strength Reports of the Continental Army. Chicago: The University of Chicago Press, 1976.
Martyn, Charles. The Life of Artemas Ward, First Commander-in-Chief of the American Revolution. New York: Artemas Ward, 1921.
Massachusetts. Office of the Secretary of State. Massachusetts Soldiers and Sailors of the Revolutionary War. A compilation from the archives, prepared and published by the Secretary of the Commonwealth in accordance with chapter 100, resolves of 1891. 17 vols. Boston: Wright and Potter Printing Co., State Printers, 1896–1908. Online at
Peterson, Harold L. The Book of the Continental Soldier. Harrisburg, Pa.: Stackpole Books, 1968.
Wright, Robert K. The Continental Army. Washington, D.C.: United States Army Center of Military History, 1983. Available online

External links 
Bibliography of the Continental Army in Massachusetts compiled by the United States Army Center of Military History
Massachusetts Soldiers and Sailors of the Revolutionary War Volume 4 1898
Massachusetts Soldiers and Sailors of the Revolutionary War Volume 10 1902
Massachusetts Soldiers and Sailors of the Revolutionary War Volume 14 1906